Timo Sild (born February 26, 1988) is an Estonian orienteering competitor and junior world champion.

Family 
Timo is the elder son of orienteers Sixten Sild of Estonia and Sarmite Sild of Latvia. His younger brother is called Lauri Sild.

Career

Junior World Championships
He became Junior World Champion in the relay in Druskininkai in 2006, together with Mihkel Järveoja and Markus Puusepp. He received a silver medal in the long distance in 2008.

Senior career 
Sild has competed in the 2013, 2014, 2015, 2016 and 2017 World Orienteering Championships, as part of the Estonian relay team as well as in individual distances.

See also
 Estonian orienteers
 List of orienteers
 List of orienteering events

References

External links
 

1988 births
Living people
Estonian orienteers
Male orienteers
Foot orienteers
Estonian people of Latvian descent
Junior World Orienteering Championships medalists
Competitors at the 2022 World Games